The Box–Muller transform, by George Edward Pelham Box and Mervin Edgar Muller, is a random number sampling method for generating pairs of independent, standard, normally distributed (zero expectation, unit variance) random numbers, given a source of uniformly distributed random numbers. The method was in fact first mentioned explicitly by Raymond E. A. C. Paley and Norbert Wiener in 1934.

The Box–Muller transform is commonly expressed in two forms. The basic form as given by Box and Muller takes two samples from the uniform distribution on the interval [0, 1] and maps them to two standard, normally distributed samples.  The polar form takes two samples from a different interval, [−1, +1], and maps them to two normally distributed samples without the use of sine or cosine functions.

The Box–Muller transform was developed as a more computationally efficient alternative to the inverse transform sampling method. The ziggurat algorithm gives a more efficient method for scalar processors (e.g. old CPUs), while the Box–Muller transform is superior for processors with vector units (e.g. GPUs or modern CPUs).

Basic form
Suppose U1 and U2 are independent samples chosen from the uniform distribution on the unit interval (0, 1). Let

and

Then Z0 and Z1 are independent random variables with a standard normal distribution.

The derivation is based on a property of a two-dimensional Cartesian system, where X and Y coordinates are described by two independent and normally distributed random variables, the random variables for R2 and Θ (shown above) in the corresponding polar coordinates are also independent and can be expressed as

and

Because R2 is the square of the norm of the standard bivariate normal variable (X, Y), it has the chi-squared distribution with two degrees of freedom. In the special case of two degrees of freedom, the chi-squared distribution coincides with the exponential distribution, and the equation for R2 above is a simple way of generating the required exponential variate.

Polar form

 The polar form was first proposed by J. Bell and then modified by R. Knop. While several different versions of the polar method have been described, the version of R. Knop will be described here because it is the most widely used, in part due to its inclusion in Numerical Recipes.

Given u and v, independent and uniformly distributed in the closed interval [−1, +1], set . Because u and v are uniformly distributed and because only points within the unit circle have been admitted, the values of s will be uniformly distributed in the open interval (0, 1), too. The latter can be seen by calculating the cumulative distribution function for s in the interval (0, 1). From this we find the probability density function to have the constant value 1 on the interval (0, 1).

The advantage is that calculating the trigonometric functions directly can be avoided. This is helpful when trigonometric functions are more expensive to compute than the single division that replaces each one.

Just as the basic form produces two standard normal deviates, so does this alternate calculation.

and

Contrasting the two forms
The polar method differs from the basic method in that it is a type of rejection sampling.  It discards some generated random numbers, but can be faster than the basic method because it is simpler to compute (provided that the random number generator is relatively fast) and is more numerically robust. Avoiding the use of expensive trigonometric functions improves speed over the basic form. It discards  of the total input uniformly distributed random number pairs generated, i.e. discards  uniformly distributed random number pairs per Gaussian random number pair generated, requiring  input random numbers per output random number.

The basic form requires two multiplications, 1/2 logarithm, 1/2 square root, and one trigonometric function for each normal variate. On some processors, the cosine and sine of the same argument can be calculated in parallel using a single instruction. Notably for Intel-based machines, one can use the fsincos assembler instruction or the expi instruction (usually available from C as an intrinsic function), to calculate complex

 

and just separate the real and imaginary parts.

Note: 
To explicitly calculate the complex-polar form use the following substitutions in the general form,

Let  and  Then

 

The polar form requires 3/2 multiplications, 1/2 logarithm, 1/2 square root, and 1/2 division for each normal variate.  The effect is to replace one multiplication and one trigonometric function with a single division and a conditional loop.

Tails truncation
When a computer is used to produce a uniform random variable it will inevitably have some inaccuracies because there is a lower bound on how close numbers can be to 0. This means that the algorithm will not produce random variables more than 6.660 standard deviations from the mean. This corresponds to a proportion of  lost due to the truncation, where  is the standard cumulative normal distribution.

Implementation
The standard Box–Muller transform generates values from the standard normal distribution (i.e. standard normal deviates) with mean 0 and standard deviation 1. The implementation below in standard C++ generates values from any normal distribution with mean  and variance .  If  is a standard normal deviate, then  will have a normal distribution with mean  and standard deviation .  The random number generator has been seeded to ensure that new, pseudo-random values will be returned from sequential calls to the generateGaussianNoise function.

#include <cmath>
#include <limits>
#include <random>
#include <utility>

std::pair<double, double> generateGaussianNoise(double mu, double sigma)
{
    constexpr double epsilon = std::numeric_limits<double>::epsilon();
    constexpr double two_pi = 2.0 * M_PI;

    //initialize the random uniform number generator (runif) in a range 0 to 1
    static std::mt19937 rng(std::random_device{}()); // Standard mersenne_twister_engine seeded with rd()
    static std::uniform_real_distribution<> runif(0.0, 1.0);

    //create two random numbers, make sure u1 is greater than epsilon
    double u1, u2;
    do
    {
        u1 = runif(rng);
    }
    while (u1 <= epsilon);
    u2 = runif(rng);

    //compute z0 and z1
    auto mag = sigma * sqrt(-2.0 * log(u1));
    auto z0  = mag * cos(two_pi * u2) + mu;
    auto z1  = mag * sin(two_pi * u2) + mu;

    return std::make_pair(z0, z1);
}

See also
 Inverse transform sampling
 Marsaglia polar method, similar transform to Box–Muller, which uses Cartesian coordinates, instead of polar coordinates

References

External links
 
 How to Convert a Uniform Distribution to a Gaussian Distribution (C Code)

Transforms
Non-uniform random numbers
Articles with example C++ code